The 1992–93 BHL season was the 11th season of the British Hockey League, the top level of ice hockey in Great Britain. 10 teams participated in the league, and the Cardiff Devils won the league title by finishing first in the regular season. They also won the playoff championship.

Regular season

Playoffs

Group A

Group B

Semifinals
Cardiff Devils 9-0 Murrayfield Racers
Humberside Seahawks 5-4 (OT) Nottingham Panthers

Final
Cardiff Devils 7-4 Humberside Seahawks

References

External links
Season on hockeyarchives.info

1992–93 in British ice hockey
United
British Hockey League seasons